At Night You Also Sleep (De noche también se duerme) is a 1956 Argentine comedy film directed by Enrique Carreras and written by Abel Santacruz. It stars Ana Mariscal, Olga Zubarry, Jorge Rivier and Roberto Escalada and premiered on 19 January 1956.

Plot 
A divorced couple find their path to reuniting complicated by another couple. Elvira (Zubarry) swallows some powder and passes out. The doctor (Escalada) is called.

Cast
  Ana Mariscal as Rosalía
  Olga Zubarry as Elvira
  Jorge Rivier as Miguel
  Roberto Escalada as Dr. Juan Carlos Carreño
  Francisco Álvarez as Don Ramiro
  Tono Andreu as Gervasio
  Héctor Armendáriz as Vicente
  Elcira Olivera Garcés as Carmen
  Emilio Vieyra
  María Esther Podestá as Doña Beba
  Julia Dalmas
  Roberto Lombard
  Nina Marqui
  Irma Román
  Fernando Reynal
  Raquel Beney
  Gogó Andreu
 Irma Álvarez

Reception 
La Nación reviewed the film as "Equivocal and entangled in smiling comedy". El Mundo wrote: "Enrique Carreras takes the straightest and most comfortable path".

References

External links 
 

1956 films
1950s Spanish-language films
Argentine black-and-white films
Argentine comedy films
1956 comedy films
1950s Argentine films
Films directed by Enrique Carreras